Juan Manuel Sánchez Miño (born 1 January 1990) is an Argentine professional footballer who plays for Colón as a left-back or winger.

He holds an Italian passport.

Career

Boca Juniors
Sánchez Miño began his playing career in 2004, when he arrived as a teenager in the youth sector of Boca Juniors. He made his official debut for the Xeneizes in 2010 against Quilmes. It was not until 2012 when, entering often as a substitute, he gained recognition during a very good season that included his first goal in the local league, against San Lorenzo, and three goals at the 2012 Copa Libertadores: against Arsenal de Sarandí, against Fluminense on 11 April, and against Universidad de Chile on 14 June in the semifinal.

Torino
He took part in Torino's pre-season retreat in July 2014, however, his signing was delayed following problems over the players passport, with Torino having already filled their non-EU squad quota.  This was resolved, as he received an Italian passport in August, through a confirmed Italian ancestry in Soveria Mannelli, a Calabrian region of southern Italy. On 9 August 2014 Torino officially announced they had signed Sánchez Miño for an undisclosed fee from Boca Juniors. He debuted in Serie A on 1 September 2014 in Torino-Inter, 0–0.

Elche
On 15 September 2020, Sánchez Miño joined La Liga newcomers Elche CF. On 1 February 2021, Elche and Sánchez parted-ways, making Sánchez Miño a free-agent.

Estudiantes de La Plata 
On 17 February 2021, Sánchez Miño returned to Argentina and signed with Argentine Primera División side Estudiantes de La Plata.

Colón
In January 2022, Sánchez moved to fellow league club Colón on a deal until the end of 2023.

Style of play
He can play as a left-back or a left-sided winger. He combines good pace with the ability to move into channels, as well as a strong left foot.

Career statistics

Club
Updated 1 January 2015.

1Continental competitions include the Copa Libertadores, the Copa Sudamericana and the UEFA Cup / UEFA Europa League

References

External links
 Goal Profile
 
 Statistics on Futbolxxi.com  

1990 births
Living people
Argentine footballers
Argentine expatriate footballers
Association football defenders
Association football wingers
Boca Juniors footballers
Torino F.C. players
Estudiantes de La Plata footballers
Cruzeiro Esporte Clube players
Club Atlético Independiente footballers
Elche CF players
Club Atlético Colón footballers
Argentine Primera División players
Serie A players
Campeonato Brasileiro Série A players
La Liga players
Argentine expatriate sportspeople in Italy
Argentine expatriate sportspeople in Brazil
Argentine expatriate sportspeople in Spain
Expatriate footballers in Italy
Expatriate footballers in Brazil
Expatriate footballers in Spain
Footballers from Buenos Aires